Rupa Bishwakarma is a Nepalese politician, belonging to the Nepali Congress Party. She is currently serving as the member of the 2nd Federal Parliament of Nepal. In the 2022 Nepalese general election she was elected as a proportional representative from the dalit people category.

References

Living people
Nepal MPs 2022–present
21st-century Nepalese women politicians
Communist Party of Nepal (Unified Marxist–Leninist) politicians
Year of birth missing (living people)